The 1967–68 1re série season was the 47th season of the 1re série, the top level of ice hockey in France. Four teams participated in the final round, and Chamonix Hockey Club won their 24th league title.

First round

Paris
Français Volants and Athletic Club de Boulogne-Billancourt qualified for the final round.

Alpes

Final round

External links
Season on hockeyarchives.info

France
1967–68 in French ice hockey
Ligue Magnus seasons